Anouk Masson Krantz is a French photographer, living in New York City, who has made work about cowboys and ranching in the Western United States. She has had a solo exhibition at the National Cowboy & Western Heritage Museum in Oklahoma.

Early life and education
Krantz was born in L'Union, a suburb of Toulouse, France. She moved to the United States in the late 1990s. Living in New York City, she completed high school at the Lycée Français de New York and earned a bachelor's degree. In New York she worked for a lifestyle magazine and at Cartier's corporate office, and later studied at the International Center of Photography.

Work
Wild Horses of Cumberland Island (2017) is about a band of feral horses living on Cumberland Island, off Georgia. The rest of Krantz's work has been about the Western United States and its cowboys and ranching communities. American Cowboys (2021) contains a "photographic study of this often overlooked, misunderstood world, from the families immersed in the culture to the hard work and labor of ranching and rodeos."

Publications
Wild Horses of Cumberland Island. Mulgrave: Images, 2017. .
West: The American Cowboy. Mulgrave: Images, 2019. .
American Cowboys. Melbourne, Victoria: Images, 2021. . With a foreword by Taylor Sheridan.
Ranchland: Wagonhound. Mulgrave: Images, 2022. . With a foreword by Gretel Ehrlich.

Solo exhibitions
West: The American Cowboy, National Cowboy & Western Heritage Museum, Oklahoma City, Oklahoma, 2020

References

External links

French women photographers
21st-century French photographers
People from L'Union
Living people
Year of birth missing (living people)